 is a Japanese photographer noted for his photographs of nudes.

Ichimura was born, with the family name Hamaguchi, in Nagasaki on 10 June 1930. As a young adult Ichimura moved to Tokyo, where he studied for a year at Nihon University, took various jobs, and chanced to meet Shōtarō Akiyama, who aroused his interest in photography. He quickly moved to nude photography, and had his first solo exhibition, "Love & Lost", in Fuji Photo Salon in 1963. He also participated in exhibitions overseas: "New Japanese Photography" in New York (7 Works  owned by MoMA) in 1974 and an exhibition of eight Japanese photographers in Graz in 1976. From the late 1970s Ichimura branched out to photographs of Japanese iconography and landscape, particularly that of his native Nagasaki.

Books by Ichimura

Konna sei no hanashi mo aru. Tokyo: Besutoserāzu, 1970. Text by Daihachi Izumi, photographs by Ichimura.
Seidan to nūdo no fūkei. Tokyo: Besutoserāzu, 1970.
Kyōki no utage Salome (Salome). Tokyo: Jitsugyō no Nihon sha, 1970.
Come Up. Tokyo: Shashinhyōronsha, 1971.
Onna to otoko: Imayō shunga. Gendai Shashinka Shirīzu. Tokyo: Ado angen, 1972. With Yoshihiro Tatsuki and Tenmei Kanō.
Shashin no shisō. Tokyo: Bijutsu Shuppansha, 1978.
Nihon no kokoro / Impressions of Japan. Tokyo: Canon Club, 1978.
Onna soshite daraku.... Tokyo: Besutoserāzu, 1983. .
Nagasaki. Tokyo: Asahi Shinbunsha, 1988. .
() / Sakura Blossom. Tokyo: Nippon Camera-sha, 1992.
Body: Mega・sexual photo.  Tokyo: Hanashi no Tokushū, 1994. .
Ichimura Tetsuya feromon sakuhinshū: "Shunga" erotic picture do H (："Shunga" erotic picture do H). Tokyo: Wanimagajinsha, 1995. .
Tsuyu: Neo-waisetsu shashinshū. Tokyo: Hokuō Shobō / Japan Mix, 1997. .

Other books with photographs by Ichimura
 Nihon nūdo meisakushū (日本ヌード名作集, Japanese nudes). Camera Mainichi bessatsu. Tokyo: Mainichi Shinbunsha, 1982.  Pp. 228–33 show Ichimura's work.
Szarkowski, John, and Shōji Yamagishi. New Japanese Photography. New York: Museum of Modern Art, 1974.  (hard),  (paper). Includes six pages of photographs by Ichimura.

Notes

References
 Kasahara Michiko (笠原美智子). Nihon shashinka jiten ( / 328 Outstanding Japanese Photographers. Kyoto: Tankōsha, 2000. . P. 43.

Japanese photographers
1930 births
Living people
Artists from Nagasaki Prefecture
Nihon University alumni
People from Nagasaki